Maider Unda Gonzalez de Audikana (born 2 July 1977 in Vitoria, Spain) is a Basque Spanish retired female freestyle wrestler.

She participated in Women's freestyle wrestling 72 kg at the 2008 Summer Olympics. In the 1/8 final she beat Oksana Vashchuk (Ukraine). In the quarter-final she lost to Stanka Zlateva (Bulgaria). In the repechage round, after beating Canadian Ohenewa Akuffo she lost to Agnieszka Wieszczek in the bronze medal match.

At the 2012 Summer Olympics, Unda won the bronze medal in Women's freestyle wrestling 72 kg. In the 1/8 final she beat Ana Betancur from Colombia, and Ochirbatyn Burmaa from Mongolia in the quarter-final. She lost in the semi-final against Stanka Zlateva but beat Vasilisa Marzaliuk (Belarus) for the bronze medal.

On 9 November 2016, Unda announced her retirement from wrestling after failing to qualify for the 2016 Summer Olympics.

Unda runs a sheep farm in the village of Olaeta in Aramaio producing Idiazabal cheese, which she combined with her career in sports.

References

External links
 Athlete profile on beijing2008.com
  maiderunda.com
 

Living people
1977 births
Sportspeople from Vitoria-Gasteiz
Wrestlers at the 2008 Summer Olympics
Wrestlers at the 2012 Summer Olympics
Olympic wrestlers of Spain
Olympic bronze medalists for Spain
Olympic medalists in wrestling
Spanish female sport wrestlers
Medalists at the 2012 Summer Olympics
European Games medalists in wrestling
European Games bronze medalists for Spain
Wrestlers at the 2015 European Games
World Wrestling Championships medalists
European Wrestling Championships medalists